Ivan Rachůnek (born July 6, 1981) is a Czech former professional ice hockey player. He was selected by the Tampa Bay Lightning in the seventh round (187th overall) of the 1999 NHL Entry Draft. Rachunek is the brother of Karel Rachunek and Tomas Rachunek who have also played professional ice hockey.

Rachunek played with HC Zlín in the Czech Extraliga during the 2010–11 Czech Extraliga season.

References

External links

1981 births
Czech ice hockey forwards
PSG Berani Zlín players
Living people
Tampa Bay Lightning draft picks
Sportspeople from Zlín
Czech expatriate ice hockey players in Switzerland
Czech expatriate ice hockey players in Canada
Czech expatriate ice hockey players in Slovakia
Czech expatriate ice hockey players in Finland
Czech expatriate ice hockey players in Germany